Váci Mihály Kollégium is a school located in Zugló district, Budapest, Hungary. It is named after the poet Mihály Váci.

External links
Official website

Schools in Budapest